Querbach is a river of Bavaria, Germany. It is the left headwater of the Westerbach.

The Querbach rises in the Arzborn (sometimes called Atzborn), a larger spring on the Hoher Querberg (474 m). It is located northeast of Westerngrund, in the Atzborn forest area, near the state border with Hesse. The spring water flows from a small opening on the mountainside.

The Querbach runs in a southwesterly direction to Huckelheim. There it unites with the Huckelheimer Bach to form the Westerbach.

See also
List of rivers of Bavaria

References

Rivers of Bavaria
Rivers of the Spessart
Rivers of Germany